Joshua C. Gallion (born March 19, 1979) is an American Republican politician and accountant who has served as North Dakota State Auditor since 2017.

Biography

Gallion, born in Spokane, Washington, served in the United States Air Force from 1998 until 2002, settling in North Dakota after his enlistment. He graduated with an associate degree from Bismarck State College, with a bachelor's degree from Dickinson State University, and with a master's degree from the University of North Dakota in 2014.

Gallion served as accounting manager for the North Dakota Public Service Commission. He was nominated as the Republican candidate for state auditor in April 2016, defeating Brian Kroshus at the state Republican convention. In the general election, he faced off against Libertarian candidate Roland Riemers, who has unsuccessfully sought various political offices over the past several years, and formerly served as state Libertarian Party chair. Gallion defeated Riemers, 77%–23%. He carried every county except for two. He was reelected in 2020 with 68% of the vote.

Personal life
Gallion and his wife, Becky, have two daughters.

References

External links
 Office of Joshua C. Gallion, North Dakota State Auditor
 Joshua Gallion for State Auditor

1979 births
American accountants
Bismarck State College alumni
Dickinson State University alumni
Living people
North Dakota Republicans
North Dakota State Auditors
Politicians from Spokane, Washington
United States Air Force airmen
University of North Dakota alumni